Raymond Hiley Harries,  (1916 – 14 May 1950) was a Royal Air Force fighter pilot and flying ace of the Second World War. Harries scored 15 victories against enemy aircraft, as well as three shared kills, two probable kills and five damaged during the war. Harries is also credited with the destruction of a V-1 flying bomb.

Early life
Born in South Wales in 1916, Harries was a dental student at Guy's Hospital when war broke out.

RAF career
Joining the Royal Air Force Volunteer Reserve (RAFVR) in September 1939, after training Harries was posted to No. 43 Squadron at Drem in Scotland. He was then posted on 8 July 1941 to No. 52 Operational Training Unit at Debden as an instructor. In February 1942 he joined No. 131 Squadron RAF, based at Llanbedr as a flight commander, and claimed his first kill, a Junkers Ju 88, soon after. He served with the unit until December 1942, when he became commanding officer of No. 91 Squadron, and in April 1943 received the new Mark XII Spitfire and were based at Hawkinge.

Harries was the most successful pilot to fly the Rolls-Royce Griffon powered Supermarine Spitfire, scoring 11 kills in the type, including a brace of Focke-Wulf Fw 190s on 25 May 1943. Flying a Spitfire XII, Harries intercepted the Fw 190s from SKG 10:

The Fw 190 was thought to be Fw 190A-5 Wrk Nr 2511 of 6./SKG 10, flown by Oberleutnant Josef Keller.

In June the squadron moved to Westhampnett to form a Mk XII fighter wing with No. 41 Squadron.

On 18 July 1943 Harries shot down three Bf 109s while flying MB831. In doing so he became the first pilot to reach five kills in the Griffon-engined Spitfire. Harries became wing leader in August 1943, and by November, had been awarded the Distinguished Flying Cross (DFC) and a Distinguished Service Order (DSO).

In early 1944 Harries went to the United States, to lecture on fighter tactics, only to return and become wing leader of No. 135 Wing, 2nd TAF, in the spring of 1944. On 22 September 1943 Harries claimed one Fw 190 shot down and another as a probable. The Westhampnett Wing were the highest scoring Wing  in Fighter Command for the month of September, claiming 27 kills.

On 20 October 1944 Harries shot down a pair of Messerschmitt Bf 109Gs near Rouen, his last kills in the type.

In January 1945 he underwent a conversion course on the Hawker Tempest, prior to the wing being re-equipped, but was posted then to 84 Group as Wing Commander/Training.

After the war he was awarded a bar to the DSO, and served as commanding officer No. 92 Squadron RAF in 1949.

On 14 May 1950 he died while flying a No. 92 Squadron Gloster Meteor F4 when it ran out of fuel and crashed near Sheffield, Yorkshire. His funeral was held at RAF Linton-on-Ouse on 18 May 1950.

References

Notes

Bibliography
 Thomas, Andrew. (2008). Griffon Spitfire Aces. Osprey Publishing, London, England. 
 C. Shores & C Williams. (1994) Aces High . Grub Street.

Royal Air Force wing commanders
Royal Air Force pilots of World War II
British World War II flying aces
English aviators
Welsh aviators
Recipients of the Croix de guerre (Belgium)
Recipients of the Croix de Guerre 1939–1945 (France)
Aviators killed in aviation accidents or incidents in England
Companions of the Distinguished Service Order
Recipients of the Distinguished Flying Cross (United Kingdom)
1950 deaths
1916 births
Royal Air Force Volunteer Reserve personnel of World War II